The table below lists capitals serving as administrative divisions by country.

Countries where the capital is a first-level subdivision

Countries where the capital is a second-level subdivision

Countries where the capital is a third-level subdivision

Countries where the capital is a conglomeration of subdivisions

Countries where the capital is not a subdivision

Countries that have no subdivision

Countries usually considered city-states

Countries de facto unoccupied

Footnotes

See also 
 :Category:Capitals for other lists of capitals
 List of autonomous areas by country
 Table of administrative country subdivisions by country
 Capital districts and territories

Serving as administrative divisions
 capitals serving as administrative divisions
Capitals serving as administrative divisions